Consumed: How shopping fed the class system  is a 2013 book by Harry Wallop.  It explores our personal identity and sense of self and self-worth have come to be defined by what we buy.  It uses several detailed examples to show how advertisers and marketeers have driven our consumerism.

References 

2013 non-fiction books
HarperCollins books
Non-fiction books about consumerism